The Shaolin Afronauts are an Afrobeat band based in Adelaide, Australia. Their music is heavily influenced by West African Afrobeat artists such as Fela Kuti, but also incorporates elements of avant-garde jazz, soul and  other traditional African and Cuban percussive rhythms. They describe their music as "interstellar futurist afro-soul".

Career

2008–2010: Origins and style
Founded in 2008 out of a fascination with Afrobeat and creative  improvised music, seven out of the ten band members were also members of The Transatlantics, who met at the University of Adelaide. The Transatlantics favoured many different styles of music, especially that of West and East Africa, but the breakaway group wanted to create something a bit looser and more interpretative, less arranged. The group started out as a side project, but found it worked well together from the start. Bassist Ross McHenry says that he was inspired by the Afrobeat music he heard at WOMADelaide as a child, and he likes to write and play music infused with soul and guided by intuition.

The musicians particularly styled their music after the Afrobeat style of Fela Kuti and his Africa '70 band and other West African music. A lesser but important influence was the 1970s avant-garde jazz movement, especially artists like Sun Ra and Pharoah Sanders. Their sound also incorporates soul and traditional African and Cuban percussive rhythms.

, the Shaolin Afronauts' Facebook page describes their music as "interstellar futurist afro-soul".

2011–present: album releases 
In 2011, they played at WOMADelaide. The song "Kilimanjaro" was the first release by the band. Later in 2011, they were signed to Freestyle records and saw the release of their debut album, Flight of the Ancients. The album was featured on Radio National Breakfast and garnered considerable attention on community radio, streetpress and Triple J.

In January 2012 the band recorded their second album, Quest under Capricorn, with an expanded ensemble of 18 musicians. 

In September 2014, the band released their third album, Follow the Path. Also in 2014, the band played at Glastonbury. They continued to play regular gigs around Adelaide and occasional gigs and festivals elsewhere, including the two-day Blenheim Music and Camping Festival in the Clare Valley, north of Adelaide, in 2015.

In October 2016, Shaolin Afronauts played the Kennedys Creek Music Festival in Victoria.

In July 2017 the group reprised their Quest under Capricorn performance at The Gov as part of the Umbrella: Winter City Sounds festival and played with their usual complement at Here's to Now at Coriole Vineyards in December of the same year.

As part of the Adelaide Festival in March 2020, the Afronauts performed a show called "Mad Max Meets The Shaolin Afronauts", where the classic dystopian thriller, the first Mad Max film, was played with subtitles, with accompanying score played live by the band. They played 10 songs, starting with "Kilimanjaro" and finishing with "Baie de Sangareya".

Discography

Albums

Awards and nominations

ARIA Music Awards
The ARIA Music Awards is an annual awards ceremony that recognises excellence, innovation, and achievement across all genres of Australian music. They commenced in 1987.

! 
|-
| 2011
| Flight of the Ancients 
| ARIA Award for Best World Music Album
| 
| 
|-

Fowler's Live Music Awards
The Fowler's Live Music Awards took place from 2012 to 2014 to "recognise success and achievement over the past 12 months [and] celebrate the great diversity of original live music" in South Australia. Since 2015 they're known as the South Australian Music Awards.

 
|-
| 2012
| Shaolin Afronauts 
| Best New World Artist 
| 
|- 
| 2014
| Shaolin Afronauts 
| Best New World Artist 
| 
|-

National Live Music Awards
The National Live Music Awards (NLMAs) are a broad recognition of Australia's diverse live industry, celebrating the success of the Australian live scene. The awards commenced in 2016.

|-
| National Live Music Awards of 2016
| Ross McHenry (Shaolin Afronauts)
| Live Bassist of the Year
|

Band members

Current
Members as listed on their Facebook page :
 Ross McHenry - Bass guitar and leader
 Kevin van der Zwaag - Drums
 Jarrad Payne - Percussion
 Dylan Marshall - Guitar
 Lachlan Ridge - Guitar
 Adam Page - Woodwind
 Jason McMahon - Woodwind
 Chris Weber - Trumpet
 Jon Hunt - Woodwind
 Tim Bennett - Percussion
 Django Rowe - Guitar
 Brenton Foster - Keyboards

Past credits
On Flight of the Ancients (2011):
 Kevin van der Zwaag, drums   
 Lachlan Ridge, guitar   
 Kahil Nayton, guitar   
 Dylan Marshall, guitar   
 Jon Hunt, baritone saxophone and bass clarinet   
 Chris Soole, alto saxophone   
 Chris Weber, trumpet   
 Joel Prime, percussion   
 Tim Bennett, percussion   
 David van der Zwaag, shekere and hand percussion   
 Tim Wilsdon, congas   
 Ross McHenry, bass and leader

Collaborators on Quest under Capricorn (2012):
Derek Pascoe - Tenor saxophone
Andrew Crago - Saxophones
Max Franklin - Saxophones
David van der Zwaag - Percussion
Joel Prime - Percussion
Pat Thiele
Sam Eads
Kyra Schwartz
Luca Spiler - Trombone, Bass trombone

At Blenheim Festival, March 2015:
Ross McHenry - Bass guitar
Kevin van der Zwaag - Drums
Jarrad Payne - Percussion
Dylan Marshall - Guitar, synthesiser
Lachlan Ridge - Guitar
Adam Page - Tenor saxophone, flute
Jason McMahon - Baritone saxophone
Tim Bennett - Percussion
Chris Weber - Trumpet
Stephen McEntee - Trombone

Individual work

Ross McHenry
Ross McHenry released an album, Child of Somebody, in July 2016, which was recorded in New York and includes artists Marcus Strickland, Mark de Clive-Lowe, Tivon Pennicott, Duane Eubanks and Corey King. He also formed the Ross McHenry Trio, with New Zealand drummer Myele Manzanza and pianist Matthew Sheens, who played at the Melbourne International Jazz Festival in June 2016 and released an album, The Outsiders, to critical acclaim in 2017. McHenry and Tara Lynch, original Transatlantics vocalist, are married and have a daughter born around 2014.

Awards
The Fowler's Live Music Awards took place from 2012 to 2014 to "recognise success and achievement over the past 12 months [and] celebrate the great diversity of original live music" in South Australia. Since 2015 they're known as the South Australian Music Awards. In 2014, Henry won Best Jazz Artist

The National Live Music Awards (NLMAs) are a broad recognition of Australia's diverse live industry, celebrating the success of the Australian live scene. The awards commenced in 2016. In 2016, Henry was nominated as Live Bassist of the Year.

Dylan Marshall / Didier Kumalo
Composer and guitarist Dylan Marshall hails from Cape Town, South Africa, where he was inspired by local pioneers of jazz such as Abdullah Ibrahim and Chris McGregor, as well as other African musicians, including  Bembeya Jazz National, OK Jazz, and Super Biton de Ségou. His musical influences also include 80s electro-funk, 70s jazz-rock and hip hop music. In 2017, he formed a five-piece band called Didier Kumalo, which pays tribute to some of the classic African jazz ensembles, but influenced by contemporary musical techniques and styles, including electronic and acoustic. Didier Kumalo is scheduled to play at WOMADelaide in March 2023.

References

Afro-beat musical groups
Musical groups from Adelaide
Musical groups established in 2008